Keith Duane Flowers (April 24, 1930 – November 12, 1993) was an American football player who played one season in the National Football League with the Detroit Lions and Dallas Texans. He was drafted by the Detroit Lions in the eleventh round of the 1952 NFL Draft. He played college football at Texas Christian University and attended Perryton High School in Perryton, Texas.

References

External links
Just Sports Stats

1930 births
1993 deaths
Players of American football from Texas
American football centers
TCU Horned Frogs football players
Detroit Lions players
Dallas Texans (NFL) players
People from Perryton, Texas